Kandurata cricket team was a Sri Lankan first class cricket team based in Kandy, that represented Central Province of Sri Lanka. Kandurata competed in all three provincial tournaments:the first class cricket competition known as the Inter-Provincial First Class Tournament, the List A cricket competition known as the Inter-Provincial Limited Over Tournament and the Twenty20 competition known as the Inter-Provincial Twenty20.

Kandurata is the current champion of Inter-Provincial Limited Over Tournament, and has won title in 2010–11, 2009–10, and the joint title in 2007–08 series. In 2007/08 Inter-provincial Limited overs tournament, Kandurata reached the finals by winning all their round robin matches, but the game was washed out due to rain.

Name
From the commence of Inter-Provincial Cricket Tournament, the team representing Central Province is known as Central province team. But from the 2007/08 season, the team known as "Kandurata" team. "Kandurata" is Sinhala for "Hill country". The hills or central highlands are mainly situated in central province.

History

Early years (1990–2000)
Sri Lanka Cricket fearing that Club cricket alone would not be enough to keep Sri Lankan cricket competitive, the Inter-Provincial Cricket Tournament was created as a domestic first-class cricket tournament in Sri Lanka in 1990. From the inauguration of the tournament, in 1990, participating teams varied from year to year. The tournament started with four provincial teams. They were Western Province, Southern Province, North Western Province and Kandurata.

In the first first-class Inter-provincial tournament, which was called the 1990 Singer Inter-Provincial Trophy, Kandurata, then called Central Province, captained by J.R.Ratnayeke, had come second out of the four provinces, losing none but second to Western Province on points, with 11.4. Western Province went on to win the tournament, not losing a game.

Establishment of Twenty20 (2000–2010)
With the establishment of Twenty20 cricket in 2003, it came to Sri Lanka in 2004 as the Twenty20 Tournament, however this was replaced with the Inter-Provincial Twenty20 in 2008. Wayamba won the 2007–08 Inter-Provincial Twenty20, which was the first edition of the tournament. They had won four out of five matches in the group stage and eventually won their way into the finals with Ruhuna. Wayamba won by 31 runs.

2010–present

Grounds and Sponsorship

The team's home ground was Asgiriya Stadium, in Kandy. Which was later changed to Pallekele International Cricket Stadium once it was fully constructed.

Pallekele International Cricket Stadium is one of the newest cricket stadiums in Sri Lanka and the newest in the city of Kandy. The stadium was declared opened on 27 November 2009. The stadium is located about a half-hour drive from Kandy. The Pallekele stadium is wholly owned by Sri Lanka Cricket and is set to displace the Asgiriya Stadium, which has hosted Tests from 1983 to 2007, as the international venue of choice around Kandy. The stadium was built by the State Engineering Corporation of Sri Lanka and is designed along the lines of SuperSport Park in Centurion, South Africa.

Mas Holdings, a Sri Lankan apparel industrial firm is the team's sponsor.

Players

Kandurata has some reputed Test cricket players such as Kumar Sangakkara and Muttiah Muralitharan. Unlike in India and Australia, where cricketers represent their home province or state, it is the norm in Sri Lanka for outside cricketers to play for another province in Inter-Provincial Tournament. This is because uneven distribution of cricketer population among provinces. Therefore, it resulted in players like Nishantha Ranatunga and Sanjeeva Ranatunga from Western Province, where the most cricketing population occurs, playing in Kandurata or Central Province.

Current squad
Players with Test caps are listed in bold. One Day International caps in italics.

 Source: Kandurata cricket team
 Source: http://www.espncricinfo.com/srilanka/content/player/caps.html?country=8;class=1

Notable players

The following is a list of notable players who have represented both Kandurata and Sri Lanka.

Honours

Domestic

First Class
Inter-Provincial First Class Tournament: 1
 2003–04

List A
Inter-Provincial Limited Over Tournament: 2
 2007–08, 2009–10

Twenty20
Inter-Provincial Twenty20: 0

References

Former senior cricket clubs of Sri Lanka